There are at least 178 named lakes and reservoirs in Carbon County, Montana.

Lakes
 Abandoned Lake, el. 
 Albino Lake, el. 
 Alp Lake, el. 
 Anchor Lake, el. 
 Anvil Lake, el. 
 Arch Lake, el. 
 Arrowhead Lake, el. 
 Basin Creek Lake, el. 
 Bergschrund Lake, el. 
 Big Butte Lake, el. 
 Big Moose Lake, el. 
 Big Park Lake, el. 
 Black Canyon Lake, el. 
 Bowback Lake, el. 
 Broadwater Lake, el. 
 Burnt Bacon Lake, el. 
 Cairn Lake, el. 
 Canyon Lake, el. 
 Castle Lake, el. 
 Cladocera Lake, el. 
 Cloverleaf Lakes, el. 
 Copeland Lake, el. 
 Copepod Lake, el. 
 Cradle Lake, el. 
 Crazy Lakes, el. 
 Crescent Lake, el. 
 Crow Lake, el. 
 Crystal Lake, el. 
 Daly Lake, el. 
 Desolation Lake, el. 
 Dewey Lake, el. 
 Diamond Lake, el. 
 Donelson Lake, el. 
 Dude Lake, el. 
 Duggan Lake, el. 
 East Rosebud Lake, el. 
 Echo Lake, el. 
 Elephant Lake, el. 
 Elk Horn Lake, el. 
 Elk Lake, el. 
 Elpestrine Lake, el. 
 Erratic Lake, el. 
 Estelle Lake, el. 
 Falls Creek Lake, el. 
 Farley Lake, el. 
 First Rock Lake, el. 
 Flat Rock Lake, el. 
 Fossil Lake, el. 
 Fritter Lake, el. 
 Frosty Lake, el. 
 Gallery Lake, el. 
 Ghost Lake, el. 
 Glissade Lake, el. 
 Goat Lake, el. 
 Golden Lake, el. 
 Granite Lake, el. 
 Granite Lake, el. 
 Gravel Lake, el. 
 Green Lake, el. 
 Greenough Lake, el. 
 Hairpin Lake, el. 
 Hatchet Lake, el. 
 Heart Lake, el. 
 Hellroaring Lake, el. 
 Hellroaring Lakes, el. 
 Hermit Lake, el. 
 Hidden Lake, el. 
 High Pass Lake, el. 
 Indian Knife Lake, el. 
 Jasper Lake, el. 
 Jenny Lake, el. 
 Jorden Lake, el. 
 Keyser Brown Lake, el. 
 Kidney Lake, el. 
 Kookoo Lake, el. 
 Lake at Falls, el. 
 Lake Elaine, el. 
 Lake Gertrude, el. 
 Lake Mary, el. 
 Lake of the Clouds, el. 
 Lake of the Winds, el. 
 Lake Susanne, el. 
 Lake Sylvan, el. 
 Lennon Lake, el. 
 Line Lake, el. 
 Little Scat Lake, el. 
 Liver Lake, el. 
 Lonesome Lake, el. 
 Lost Lake, el. 
 Lost Lake, el. 
 Lowary Lake, el. 
 Lower Arch Lake, el. 
 Lower Basin Creek Lake, el. 
 Mariane Lake, el. 
 Marker Lake, el. 
 Martin Lake, el. 
 Martin Lake, el. 
 Maryott Lake, el. 
 Medicine Lake, el. 
 Moon Lake, el. 
 Navajo Tarn, el. 
 North Hidden Lake, el. 
 Nymph Lake, el. 
 Oly Lake, el. 
 Omega Lake, el. 
 Otter Lake, el. 
 Ouzel Lake, el. 
 Pat Lake, el. 
 Picket Lake, el. 
 Planaria Lake, el. 
 Pleiades Lakes, el. 
 Rachel Lake, el. 
 Rainbow Lake, el. 
 Red Rock Lakes, el. 
 Red Storm Lake, el. 
 Rimrock Lake, el. 
 Robble Lake, el. 
 Rock Tree Lake, el. 
 Russell Lake, el. 
 Rydberg Lake, el. 
 Scat Lake, el. 
 Second Rock Lake, el. 
 Senal Lake, el. 
 September Morn Lake, el. 
 Shadow Lake, el. 
 Shadow Lake, el. 
 Sheep Lake, el. 
 Shelf Lake, el. 
 Ship Lake, el. 
 Shrew Lake, el. 
 Shrimp Lake, el. 
 Silt Lakes, el. 
 Silver Run Lakes, el. 
 Silver Tarn, el. 
 Sky Pilot Lake, el. 
 Sliderock Lake, el. 
 Slough Lake, el. 
 Smethurst Lake, el. 
 Snail Lake, el. 
 Snow Lakes, el. 
 Snowbank Lake, el. 
 Snowbank Lake, el. 
 Snowbank Lake, el. 
 Spogen Lake, el. 
 Summerville Lake, el. 
 Summit Lake, el. 
 Sundance Lake, el. 
 Thiel Lake, el. 
 Throop Lake, el. 
 Till Lake, el. 
 Timberline Lake, el. 
 Trail Lake, el. 
 Triangle Lake, el. 
 Triangle Lake, el. 
 Triskele Lake, el. 
 Twin Outlets Lake, el. 
 Two Bits Lake, el. 
 Varve Lake, el. 
 Vogel Lake, el. 
 Wand Lake, el. 
 Whitcomb Lake, el. 
 Widewater Lake, el. 
 Widowed Lake, el. 
 Wild Bill Lake, el. 
 Wright Lake, el. 
 Z Lake, el.

Reservoirs
 Adams Reservoir, el. 
 Bidstrip Reservoir, el. 
 Cooney Reservoir, el. 
 Cooney Reservoir, el. 
 Depression Reservoir, el. 
 Glacier Lake, el. 
 Glacier Lake, el. 
 Hunters Reservoir, el. 
 Jones Reservoir, el. 
 Monroe Reservoir, el. 
 Shupak Ponds, el. 
 V O Reservoir, el.

See also
 List of lakes in Montana

Notes

Carbon